Yuliana Leonidivna Fedak (born 8 June 1983) is a retired Ukrainian tennis player.

Fedak has a career high WTA singles ranking of 63, achieved on 18 September 2006. Fedak also has a career high WTA doubles ranking of 34 achieved on 15 January 2007. She also has won 6 ITF singles titles and 11 ITF doubles titles.

Fedak retired from tennis 2011.

Tennis career

Fedak partnered Ukrainian Alona Bondarenko third round women's doubles at Roland Garros. She lost to Květa Peschke and Francesca Schiavone.

She partnered with fellow Ukrainian Tatiana Perebiynis for the qualifying event of women's doubles at Wimbledon. The pair qualified for the event, then reached the semi-finals where they lost to Paola Suárez and Virginia Ruano Pascual.

WTA career finals

Doubles: 2 (0–2)

ITF finals

Singles (6–2)

Doubles (11–10)

Grand Slam performance timelines

Singles

Doubles

External links
 
 
 

1983 births
Living people
People from Nova Kakhovka
Ukrainian female tennis players
Sportspeople from Kherson Oblast
21st-century Ukrainian women